Feodor Felix Konrad Lynen  (6 April 19116 August 1979) was a German biochemist. In 1964 he won the Nobel Prize in Physiology or Medicine together with Konrad Bloch for their discoveries concerning the mechanism and regulation of cholesterol and fatty acid metabolism while he was director of the Max-Planck Institute for Cellular Chemistry in Munich.

Biography
Feodor Lynen was born in Munich on 6 April 1911. He started his studies at the chemistry department of Munich University in 1930 and graduated in March 1937 under Heinrich Wieland with the work: "On the Toxic Substances in Amanita". Lynen remained in Germany throughout World War II. In 1942 he became a chemistry lecturer at the Munich University. In 1947 he became an assistant professor and in 1953 a professor of biochemistry. From 1954 onwards he was director of the Max-Planck Institute for Cellular Chemistry in Munich, a position which was created for him at the instigation of two senior scientists, Otto Warburg and Otto Hahn. In 1972, that institute was merged into the newly founded Max-Planck Institute of Biochemistry in 1972. Also in 1972, Lynen was named President of the Gesellschaft Deutscher Chemiker (GDCh).

In 1964, he won the Nobel Prize in Physiology or Medicine together with Konrad Bloch for their discoveries concerning the mechanism and regulation of cholesterol and fatty acid metabolism. These discoveries took many years to work out. The Nobel Committee felt that this was important because understanding the metabolism of sterols and fatty acids could reveal how cholesterol affects heart disease and stroke. His Nobel Lecture on 11 December 1964 was 'The pathway from "activated acetic acid" to the terpenes and fatty acids'.

Working mostly separately, Lynen and Bloch both discovered the steps that created squalene and turned the squalene into cholesterol. Initially, Lynen found that acetate activated by Coenzyme A was needed to start the process. He discovered the chemical structure of acetyl-coenzyme A, which was needed for a detailed understanding of the biochemical pathways. He also learned that biotin, or Vitamin B7, was needed for in the process.

On 14 May 1937, Lynen married Eva Wieland (1915–2002), daughter of his academic teacher. They had five children between 1938 and 1946. Feodor Lynen died in Munich, Germany, on 6 August 1979, six weeks after an operation for aneurism.

Fellowship
The Alexander von Humboldt Foundation has a fellowship named in his honor.

Honours and awards
 1962: elected to the American Academy of Arts and Sciences
 1962: elected to the United States National Academy of Sciences
 1963: Otto Warburg Medal from the German Society for Biochemistry and Molecular Biology 
 1964: Nobel Prize in Physiology or Medicine (with Konrad Bloch) "for their discoveries concerning the mechanism and regulation of the metabolism of cholesterol and fatty acids"
 1965: Grand Cross of Merit with Star and Sash of the Federal Republic of Germany
 1966: elected to the American Philosophical Society
 1967: Norman Medal of the German Society for Fat Research
 1971: Pour le Mérite for Science and Art
 1972: Austrian Decoration for Science and Art

References

External links

 
 Feodor Lynen's Nobel lecture, "The pathway from 'activated acetic acid' to the terpenes and fatty acids"
Alexander von Humboldt Foundation, Feodor Lynen Research Fellowships

1911 births
1979 deaths
German biochemists
German Nobel laureates
Nobel laureates in Physiology or Medicine
Scientists from Munich
Ludwig Maximilian University of Munich alumni
Academic staff of the Ludwig Maximilian University of Munich
Science teachers
Foreign Members of the Royal Society
Foreign associates of the National Academy of Sciences
Max Planck Society people
Recipients of the Pour le Mérite (civil class)
Recipients of the Austrian Decoration for Science and Art
Grand Crosses with Star and Sash of the Order of Merit of the Federal Republic of Germany
Presidents of the International Union of Biochemistry and Molecular Biology
Members of the American Philosophical Society
Presidents of the German Chemical Society
Max Planck Institute directors